Brambani is an Italian surname. Notable people with the surname include:

Dominic Brambani (born 1985), Italian rugby league footballer
Lisa Brambani (born 1967), English cyclist

Italian-language surnames